Metoposauroidea is an extinct superfamily of temnospondyls that lived from the Middle to Upper Triassic in North America, Europe and North Africa. Metoposauroidea includes the families Metoposauridae and Latiscopidae.

References

Trematosaurs
Triassic temnospondyls
Middle Triassic first appearances
Late Triassic extinctions